The Great Western Railway (GWR) 5800 Class was a class of twenty 0-4-2T steam tank locomotives. They were built by the GWRs Swindon Works in 1933 and were used for light branch line work. They were similar to the GWR 1400 Class, but lacked the equipment for working autotrains. The last survivor of the class, number 5815, was with withdrawn in 1961. No members of the class were preserved.

Model form
A 5-inch gauge replica of No. 5801 has been built. It works at the Butterley Park Miniature Railway, part of the Swanwick Junction complex.

Dapol have announced O gauge versions to be released in 2018.

References

External links 
Class 5800 Details at Rail UK

0-4-2T locomotives
5800
Railway locomotives introduced in 1933
Scrapped locomotives
Standard gauge steam locomotives of Great Britain
Passenger locomotives